Shamata is both a given name and a surname. Notable people with the name include:

Shamata Anchan (born 1990), Indian model and television actress 
Chuck Shamata (born 1942), Canadian actor 
Halit Shamata (born 1954), Albanian author and politician